Sokoloff, a surname, may refer to:

Alexandra Sokoloff, American novelist and screenwriter
Eleanor Sokoloff (1914–2020), American pianist
Kenneth Sokoloff (1952–2007), American economic historian
Marla Sokoloff (born 1980), American actress
Melvin Sokoloff (1929–1990), stage name Mel Lewis, American jazz musician/drummer
Nahum Sokolow or Sokoloff (1859–1936), Zionist leader and journalist
Nikolai Sokoloff (1886–1965), Russian American conductor and violinist
Vladimir Sokoloff (1889–1962), Hollywood character actor born in Russia
Vladimir Sokoloff (pianist), (1913–1997), American pianist

See also
 Phil Sokolof (1921–2004), American health activist
 Sokolov (surname)
 Sokolow, surname
 Sokołów (disambiguation)

Jewish surnames
Bulgarian-language surnames
Russian-language surnames